James David Haluska (October 9, 1932 – September 20, 2012) was an American football quarterback who played for the Chicago Bears of the National Football League (NFL). Selected in the 30th and final round (354th overall pick) of the 1954 NFL draft, he played in five games in the 1956 season, where he completed one of four passes for a total of eight yards.

Early life 
Nicknamed "Bombo" in his youth, he attended St. Catherine's High School (Racine, Wisconsin), Class of 1950, where he was named all-conference in football and basketball. Haluska launched his collegiate career at the University of Michigan, later transferring to the University of Wisconsin-Madison. With fellow Kenosha, Wisconsin native and 1954 Heisman Trophy winner Alan Ameche in his backfield at Wisconsin, Haluska led the Badgers to the 1952 Big Ten title and a spot in the 1953 Rose Bowl, which the Badgers lost to the University of Southern California, 7–0. Haluska set Wisconsin school records in the 1952 season for yards passing (1,552) and touchdowns (12).

Haluska represented Wisconsin in the 1955 Blue–Gray Football Classic and 1956 Senior Bowl. He also played in the 1956 Chicago Tribune College All-Star Game.

High school coaching career 
As head coach at Don Bosco High School (later St. Thomas More High School) in Milwaukee, Haluska led the Cavaliers varsity football squad to its first Wisconsin Independent Schools Athletic Association (WISAA) state championship, defeating a team fielded by Fond du Lac St. Mary's Springs High School on November 13, 1976 at Titan Stadium in Oshkosh, Wisconsin. His high school teams won 12 conference championships and three WISAA state titles. He finished with a career record of 206-60-4 coaching at Milwaukee Don Bosco, Milwaukee Thomas More, Milwaukee Pius XI and Waukesha Catholic Memorial.  His coaching legacy includes the "quick kick" on second down, "form tackling", the "sleeper "play", and the "double pass".

Haluska was inducted into the UW Athletic Department Hall of Fame in 2012 and was a 2001 inductee of the Wisconsin Football Coaches Association Hall of Fame.

Awards and honors
 1995 Don Bosco High School Hall of Fame
 1998 St. Catherine's High School Athletic Hall of Fame
 2001 WFCA Hall of Fame
2011 St. Thomas More High School Athletic Hall of Fame
 2012 UW Athletic Department Hall of Fame
2015 St. Thomas More High School creates "Coach Jim Haluska Wall of Champions"
2021 Racine County Sports Hall of Fame

References

1932 births
2012 deaths
Sportspeople from Racine, Wisconsin
Players of American football from Wisconsin
American football quarterbacks
Wisconsin Badgers football players
Chicago Bears players
Sportspeople from the Milwaukee metropolitan area
American people of Slavic descent